József Haubrich (9 November 1883, Deta – 1939) was a Hungarian politician, who served as Minister of Defence twice in 1919. He was one of the leaders of the Hungarian Social Democratic Party. During the Hungarian Soviet Republic he was a member of the communist cabinet, military commander of Budapest. After the fall of the communists, he was sentenced to death by the Regency. He got into the Soviet Union with the occasion of a prisoner exchange where he lived as an ironwork worker for the remaining part of his life.

References

 Magyar Életrajzi Lexikon

1883 births
1939 deaths
People from Deta, Romania
Hungarian people of German descent
Social Democratic Party of Hungary politicians
Defence ministers of Hungary
Hungarian emigrants to the Soviet Union
People granted political asylum in the Soviet Union